NTV Arena or Nezavisna televizija Arena ('Independent') is a local commercial television channel based in Bijeljina, Bosnia and Herzegovina. The program is mainly produced in Serbian. The TV station was established in 1999. NTV Arena reports on local events in Bijeljina, Republika Srpska entity and BiH.

The channel broadcasts TV series, entertainment and news. Channel is also part of local news network in the RS entity called PRIMA mreža.

References

External links 
 www.ntvarena.com
 Communications Regulatory Agency of Bosnia and Herzegovina

Mass media in Bijeljina
Television stations in Bosnia and Herzegovina
Television channels and stations established in 1999
1999 establishments in Bosnia and Herzegovina